The  is Japanese aerial lift line in Sapporo, Hokkaidō. This is the only line  operates, while the company also operates a ski jumping course and an amusement park. Opened in 1958, the line climbs . The observatory is built for the panoramic view of the city. There also is a ski resort.

Basic data
System: Aerial tramway, 2 track cables and 2 haulage ropes
Distance: 
Vertical interval: 
Passenger capacity per a cabin: 66
Cabins: 2
Stations: 2
Time required for single ride: 5 minutes

The Mount Moiwa Ropeway was closed until 2012 for redevelopment, and has since reopened.

See also
List of aerial lifts in Japan

External links
 Mt. Moiwa Ropeway official website

Aerial tramways in Japan
Minami-ku, Sapporo
Transport in Hokkaido
Tourist attractions in Sapporo
1958 establishments in Japan